Buryat State University is an institution of higher education in Siberia and the Russian Far East, located in the city of Ulan-Ude, Buryat Republic, Russia. Courses are taught in Russian and Buryat. It was established in 1932 as the Buryat State Teachers' Training College, and became a university in 1995. It is a member of the University of the Arctic.

Founded in 1666, Ulan-Ude is situated 5500 km from Moscow, the capital of Russia, and 450 km from Ulaanbaatar.

History

History of Buryat Pedagogical Institute 
Buryat Pedagogical Institute was one of the oldest institutes of higher education in Siberia. It was organized by the Council of People's Commissars of the RSFSR of 10 January 1932 on the basis of the Buryat-Mongolian branch of the Irkutsk State Pedagogical Institute.
The composition of the institute included four departments: physics and mathematics, science, literary and linguistic, and socio-economic. The first intake, of 146 students, was in autumn 1932.

In 1932 the high school employed 22 teachers. The institute was housed in a three-story brick house on the corner of Lenin and Working streets (now Sukhbaatar). The education building had 10 classrooms and labs and one lecture hall. In the hostel, students were allocated a stone building of the former House of Farmer with 90 seats.

In autumn 1932, the institute opened pedrabfak (faculty for workers) with a four-year period of study for training, and admission to college for boys and girls with seven- and nine-year school education. In January 1933, the correspondence department was opened. In September 1934, the teachers' institute was opened. It was at the pedagogical institute and trained teachers for the seven-year schools.

Buryat Pedagogical Institute ran from 1932–1995. More than 95% of the teachers of Buryatia, and many educators in Agin and Ust-Orda Buryat Autonomous Okrugs, Irkutsk and Chita regions are graduates of the institute.

Establishment of Buryat State University 
Buryat State University, one of the oldest universities in Siberia, has been formed in accordance with Presidential Decree of 30 September 1995 and Government Decree dated 2 November 1995 on the basis of the Buryat State Pedagogical Institute (founded 1932) and the Buryat branch of Novosibirsk State University in Ulan-Ude.

BSU is a system-building educational institution, training specialists in the fields of education, science, management, economy, healthcare, social services, etc. It is named after the Buryat academic Dorzhi Banzarov.

Structure

Faculties
 Biology and Geography
 Chemistry
 History
 Law
 Physical Culture, Sport and Tourism
 Physics and Engineering
 Social Work and Psychology

Institutes
 Economics and Management
 Mathematics and Computer Science
 Medical
 Oriental Studies
 Pedagogical
 Philology and Mass Communications

BSU branches
BSU campus in Aginskoye, Zabaykalsky Krai
BSU campus in Bokhan, Irkutsk region

College
 College of post-secondary education

Other Structural Units
 Centre for career-guidance
 Institute for continuous training
 Institute of Inner Asia
 Centre for Eurasian Cooperation
 Testing language centre for foreigners
 Confucius Institute
and others.

Academics 
Research at BSU includes information and telecommunications technology and electronics, space and aviation technology, new transportation technology, new materials, ecology and rational nature-usage, and energy-saving technology.

International links 

BSU cooperates with academic and research centres in many countries. Every year, more than 150 international students study at BSU and the university carries out non-commercial students and lecturers' exchange with its foreign partner organizations. The university organises annual Lake Baikal summer camps for foreign students and teachers.

International students have the opportunity to take courses in the Russian and Buryat languages, in which they can also learn about Russian and local cultures.

BSU students study in partner universities in China, Mongolia, South Korea, Japan, Turkey, Switzerland, Austria, Poland, and Germany.

Education for international students 
The university offers courses of Russian as a foreign language. The department "Russian as a Foreign Language" was founded in September 2002 at the Philology Faculty. 
There is a Master's programme for the direction "Philology" (Russian language/Russian literature) for international students.

References

External links 
 

Buildings and structures in Ulan-Ude
Universities and institutes established in the Soviet Union
Universities in the Russian Far East
Educational institutions established in 1932
1932 establishments in the Soviet Union